Testosterone nicotinate (brand names Bolfortan, Linobol) is an androgen and anabolic steroid medication made by esterifying nicotinic acid and testosterone It was formulated as a 50 mg/mL aqueous suspension provided in ampoules. The medication was manufactured and sold by Lannacher Heilmittel GmbH in Austria. It is no longer marketed.

Testosterone nicotinate had a relatively short duration, somewhere between that of testosterone propionate and testosterone enanthate.

See also
 List of androgen esters § Testosterone esters

References

Abandoned drugs
Androgens and anabolic steroids
Androstanes
Nicotinate esters
Testosterone esters